Anatoli Viktorovich Mironov (born 26 July 1977) is a Russian professional football coach and a former player. He works as an assistant coach with FC Sokol Saratov.

Club career
He played in the Russian Football National League for FC Avangard Kursk in 2005.

External links
 

1977 births
People from Engels, Saratov Oblast
Living people
Russian footballers
Association football midfielders
FC Sokol Saratov players
FC Zvezda Irkutsk players
FC Avangard Kursk players
Russian football managers
Sportspeople from Saratov Oblast